Tapio Pylkkönen (6 February 1923 – 22 August 2005) was a Finnish footballer. He played in 25 matches for the Finland national football team from 1948 to 1952. He was also part of Finland's squad for the 1952 Summer Olympics, but he did not play in any matches.

References

External links
 

1923 births
2005 deaths
Finnish footballers
Finland international footballers
Place of birth missing
Association football defenders
Ponnistus Helsinki players